The Møller Institute is a leadership and professional development Institute at Churchill College, one of the constituent colleges of the University of Cambridge. It was founded with a gift of approximately £10 million to Churchill College, donated by the A.P. Møller & Chastine Mc-Kinney Møller Foundation, a Danish institution, set up in 1953 by shipping magnate A.P. Møller.

History

In 1988 Churchill College contacted the A.P. Møller & Chastine Mc-Kinney Møller Foundation, a Danish institution set up in 1953 by shipping magnate A.P. Møller, looking for funding for additional postgraduate student accommodation. The Foundation makes contributions to good causes, especially those involving national heritage, shipping, industry and science. Mærsk Mc-Kinney Møller was keen to support a development at Churchill College because of the college's tradition of excellence in the fields of science and engineering, and in memory of Winston Churchill. He felt that Denmark's safety during the Second World War and prosperity afterwards, had depended on Churchill's personal involvement. When war broke out Maersk ships were turned over to the British authorities to assist in the War effort, and Churchill was swift to ensure the company was paid compensation at the end of the war.

Having looked at the need for funding, Møller proposing the concept of a "Centre for Excellence" which would include meeting rooms, bedrooms and bring together commerce and education. He believed that with access to the full educational and research resources of the University of Cambridge, the Institute would be able to offer the highest standard of continuing education to international businesses wishing to develop their managerial, executive, research and development staff.

In 1992, Møller Institute was formally opened by Her Majesty Queen Ingrid of Denmark, located on the grounds of Churchill College in Cambridge. The foundation financed an expansion and improvement of the facilities in 2014–15.

Board of Directors 

  Tim How, Chair
  Professor Dame Athene Donald
  Professor Tim Minshall
  Dr Simon Bittleston
  Tamsin James
  Richard Leather (Managing Director)

Buildings

The main building was designed by a Danish Architect, Henning Larsen, with features of the Institute in typical Scandinavian design. The main building is made of Portland Stone and has teak floors throughout. The dominating element of the institute is the octagonal tower - from the terrace on the top there is a view over the centre of Cambridge. According to the institute, "in plan view, the building resembles a ship, with the tower acting as the propeller, and the lecture theatre as the bridge".

The Møller Institute's facilities include 21 meeting rooms, 92 bedrooms, a restaurant, a bar and leisure facilities. It was expanded by the construction of the Study Centre in 2007 which added additional meeting rooms, and was designed by Deborah Saunt David Hills Architects as a "collaborative learning environment".

References 

Churchill College, Cambridge
Maersk
Exhibition and conference centres in England